Duas Caras (English: Two Faces) is a Brazilian telenovela produced and broadcast by TV Globo from 1 October 2007 to 31 May 2008, replacing Paraíso Tropical and followed by A Favorita. It is created by Aguinaldo Silva and directed by Wolf Maya.
Starring Dalton Vigh, Marjorie Estiano, Alinne Moraes, Débora Falabella, Lázaro Ramos, Letícia Spiller, Betty Faria,  Flávia Alessandra, Renata Sorrah, Suzana Vieira, and Antônio Fagundes.

It is the first telenovelas to be produced on High-definition by Rede Globo at the 8 pm timeslot.

The telenovela spans through Maria Paula's revenge against Marconi Ferraço, her ex-husband that robbed her of all her inheritance.

Premise 
In the past, as Adalberto Rangel, he met and seduced Maria Paula. With a calculated coldheart, he married her, stole her fortune, then abandoned her, unaware she was pregnant at the time. Ten years later, accompanied by her son Renato, Maria Paula plots to recover her dignity and to find justice by getting revenge against the indignities done to her.

Plot
Adalberto Rangel, born Juvenaldo, lived with his poor father and siblings in a favela. Having no way to sustain the family, his father sold him (a boy) to Hermógenes Rangel, a thief. Some time later, Adalberto decides to make his own fortune without depending on his mentor. He steals all of Hermógenes' money, and flees.

During the escape, a serious car accident occurs, killing a couple. While searching the dead couple's car, Adalberto discovers a suitcase containing money, pictures and personal effects of their daughter. He proceeds to the fictitious city of Passaredo (adapted from São Bento do Sul, Santa Catarina) to meet the orphaned Maria Paula.

Adalberto lies to Maria, telling her that he was asked by her parents to care for her. The heiress's friends try to alert her, but she won't listen. Adalberto asks Maria Paula to marry him. She is swept off her feet by the con man. Not long after the wedding, Adalberto disappears. He leaves Maria absolutely nothing. Adalberto changes his entire life, including his name, home (in Rio de Janeiro) and lifestyle. He even has plastic surgery to change his face. The only person he shares his secret with is Bárbara Carreira – a prostitute to whom he lost his virginity. Adalberto, or Dr. Marconi Ferraço, makes his name as a respectable construction entrepreneur.

Some years later, Maria Paula relocates in Rio de Janeiro. She sees a news report about Ferraço, and recognizes him as her husband. She starts to track him down.

With a new identity and a lot of money in his pocket, Ferraço decides to conquer the beautiful Sílvia. She falls in love with the man she knows as Ferraço and accepts his offer of marriage. Maria Paula gatecrashes the engagement party and makes a big scene. Silvia remains engaged to him, and he becomes her first great love. Sílvia and Maria Paula both vie for Marconi Ferraço's attention. It remains unknown whether Maria Paula is interested in love or in revenge. Sílvia is slowly revealed as a psychopath, willing to go to extremes to stay with Ferraço.

Branca, Silvia's mother, discovers on the day following her husband João Pedro's death that he had an extra-marital affair for over twenty years with Célia Mara.  Branca assumes her husband's place as the president of the Universidade Pessoa de Moraes. She transforms it in an institution of excellence.

Branca's brother is Paulo Barreto (Barretão), a human rights activist. He is married to Gioconda, a great lady of the carioca society, who is a snob and a gossip. The two are parents of Júlia, a very intelligent and active girl, who fell in love with Evilásio Caó, a black man from the Portelinha favela. Thus, race and class prejudices were revealed in the family.

Portelinha was created from the determination of Juvenal Antena, born leader, smart and compassionate. Juvenal was the head of a builders' union, the GPN, who brought workers from the Northeast. The workers were told that they would receive their fees from the failed company. When the claim proved to be false, they rioted at the injustice. Juvenal resigned his position and joined the workers in their fight. He dreamt of joining those families without a home and creating a community. Though his dream was a big stretch of the imagination, Juvenal met with other demonstrators respected by the group: the Lady Setembrina, the evangelical shepherd Inácio Lisboa, the carpenter Misael Caó, the father of Evilásio and a van owner Geraldo Peixeiro. With the help of Narciso Tellerman, the secretary of State of Social Service and the future deputy, Juvenal organized an invasion of the land owned by the GPN. Fired up by Juvenal's gift for words, they took over the land they wanted. There, the community of their dreams grew: the favela of Portelinha, where there are neither drugs nor violence, and a place where people will never be without.

Marconi Ferraço bought the land of GPN, and he enters into a judicial and moral battle against Juvenal Antena.

In the last few episodes, an alliance between Ferraco and Juvenal begins. Ferraco aids Juvenal in his suit against his godson. Juvenal's opinion of Ferraco changes. He advises Maria Paula to marry Ferraco to recover her money, and for the sake of her and Ferraco's son Renato. Renato adores his father, and knows nothing of his dark past.

Hoping to separate Ferraco and Maria Paula, Silvia sends an article concerning Ferraco's fraud to Renato. She starts to lose her mind. The boy fight with Ferraço, but soon forgives her father.

Silvia escapes the mental hospital where she was locked up and kidnaps Renato. She tries to kill Maria Paula and Ferraco, but Ferraço defends his wife. He is reached in place of Maria Paula and the two are reconciled. Silvia escapes without killing anyone, and while she is fleeing she is hit by a car driven by a handsome millionaire. He takes her to live in Paris with him. She contacts her accomplice, Joao Batista, who goes to Paris to work as her driver.

Ferraco confesses his crimes as part of the prenuptial agreement he signs in order to get Maria Paula to marry him again, and he goes to jail for two years. He tells Maria Paula that the only thing he hopes in exchange for his change of heart is to have her and their son waiting for him when he gets out of jail.

Two years later, he gets out and finds that Maria Paula stole all his money and went away with Renato. While he is sitting on a beach, asking himself why would she do that to him after all the proofs he gave of his love for her, he receives a phone call from Maria Paula. She asks him what it feels like to be betrayed. He answers that he never would have believed it of her. She interrupts him and tells him where his plane ticket is, because she is waiting for him with his son.

Ferraco arrives on a beautiful island, and finds Renato walking on the beach. He runs up to him and hugs him. Then, he sees Maria Paula, and asks her what the status is of their relationship. She tells him to stop wasting time and kiss her. Ferraco smiles and kisses her passionately.

Notable cast
Marjorie Estiano - Maria Paula Fonseca do Nascimento Ferreira
Dalton Vigh - Marconi Ferraço (Adalberto Rangel / Juvenaldo Ferreira)
Alinne Moraes - Maria Sílvia Barreto Pessoa de Moraes Main Villain
Antônio Fagundes - Juvenal Antena (Juvenal Ferreira dos Santos)
Susana Vieira - Branca Maria Barreto Pessoa de Moraes
José Wilker - Francisco Macieira
Renata Sorrah - Célia Mara de Andrade Couto Melgaço
Lázaro Ramos - Evilásio Caó dos Santos
Débora Falabella - Júlia de Queiroz Barreto Caó dos Santos
Marília Pêra - Gioconda de Queiroz Barreto
Stênio Garcia - Barretão (Paulo de Queiroz Barreto)
Flávia Alessandra - Alzira de Andrade Correia
Betty Faria - Bárbara Carreira
Marília Gabriela - Guigui (Margarida McKenzie Salles Prado)
Caco Ciocler - Claudius Maciel
Marcos Winter -  Mr. Narciso Tellerman
Letícia Spiller - Maria Eva Monteiro Duarte
Juliana Knust - Débora Vieira Melgaço
Otávio Augusto - Antônio José Melgaço
Sheron Menezes - Solange Couto Ferreira dos Santos Maciel
Leona Cavalli - Dália Mendes
Júlia Almeida - Fernanda Carreira da Conceição
Júlio Rocha - JB (João Batista da Conceição)
Nuno Leal Maia - Bernardo da Conceição
Mara Manzan - Amara
Rodrigo Hilbert - Ronildo (Guilherme McKenzie Salles Prado)
Juliana Alves - Gislaine Caó dos Santos
Ângelo Antônio - Dorgival Correia
Paulo Goulart - Heriberto Gonçalves
Viviane Victorette - Nadir
Susana Ribeiro - Edivânia
Cris Vianna - Sabrina Soares da Costa de Queiroz Barreto
Marcela Barrozo - Ramona Monteiro Duarte
Thaís de Campos - Claudine Bel-Lac
Adriano Garib - Silvano
Babú Santana - Montanha
Tarcísio Meira - Hermógenes Rangel
Laura Cardoso - Alice de Souza (Ferraço's mother)
Herson Capri - João Pedro Pessoa de Moraes (Joca)
Bia Seidl - Gabriela Fonseca do Nascimento
Vanessa Giácomo - Luciana Alves Negroponte
Eriberto Leão - Ítalo Negroponte
Chica Xavier - Mãe Bina (Mother Bina) (Setembrina Caó dos Santos)
Werner Schünemann - Humberto Silveira
Vera Fischer - Dolores
Luíza Brunet - Herself
Martinho da Vila - Himself
Tony Ramos - Himself
Juliana Paes - Herself
 Francisco Cuoco - Himself
 Jean Wyllys - Himself
 Sérgio Viotti - Manuel de Andrade Couto
 Paulo César Pereio - Lobato (José Gregório dos Santos Lobato)
 Carlos Vereza - Helmut Erdmann
 Ida Gomes - Dona Frida (Mrs. Frida) (Mother of the wife of Helmut)
 Betty Lago - Soraya
 Matheus Costa - Leone Alves Negroponte
 Lady Francisco - Odete
 Pietro Mário - Fernando Pereira Salles Prado
 Lionel Fischer - Mr. Arnaldo

Soundtrack

Soundtrack With Brazilian Songs

The album containing the Portuguese songs that are part of the soundtrack:

 Tá Perdoado  - Maria Rita ( Music theme of  Maria Eva)
 Trabalhador  - Seu Jorge (Music theme of Juvenal Antena)
 Delírio dos Mortais  - Djavan (Music theme: City of Rio de Janeiro)
 Oração ao Tempo  - Caetano Veloso ( Music theme of Maria Paula)
 E Vamos á Luta  - Gonzaguinha (Opening)
 Canto de Oxum - Maria Bethânia (Music theme of Setembrina)
 Ela Une Todas as Coisas - Jorge Vercilo (Track general Romantic)
 Geraldinos e Arquibaldos  - Chicas (Music theme of Bernardinho)
 Negro Gato  - MC Leozinho (Music theme of Evilásio)
 Be Myself  - Charlie Brown Jr. (Music theme of Marconi Ferraço)
 Ternura  - Isabella Taviani (Music theme of Célia Mara)
 Toda Vez que Eu Digo Adeus - Cássia Eller ( Music theme of Sílvia)
 Você não Entende Nada  - Celso Fonseca (Music theme of Dália, Bernardinho and Heraldo)
 Folhetim  - Luiza Possi (Music theme of Alzira)
 Coisas que Eu Sei  - Danni Carlos (Music theme of Júlia)
 Quem Toma Conta de Mim - Paula Toller
 Recomeçar  - Aline Barros (the core issue of Evangelicals)
 Call Me (Instrumental)  - Victor Pozas  (Music theme of Branca)
 The Look of Love  (Instrumental) (from Casino Royale) - Victor Pozas (Music theme of Gioconda)
 Amores Cruzados - Ksis (Music theme of Débora)

International songs
The album containing the English songs that are part of the soundtrack:

 No One - Alicia Keys
 Let Me Out - Ben's Brother (Music theme of  Benoliel)
 Same Mistake - James Blunt ( Music theme of Maria Paula and Ferraço)
 Scared - Tiago Lorc (Music theme of  Sílvia and Ferraço)
 Lost Without You - Robin Thicke (Music theme of Sílvia)
 Kiss Kiss - Chris Brown feat. T-Pain ( Music theme of Zidane e Gyslaine)
 So Much for You - Ashley Tisdale (Music theme of  Alzira)
 Gimme More - Britney Spears (Music theme of Texas Bar)
 2 Hearts - Kylie Minogue (Music theme of Débora)
 How Deep Is Your Love - The Bird and the Bee (Music theme of Dália, Bernadinho e Heraldo)
 You Are So Beautiful - Ivo Pessoa (Music theme of  Júlia and Evilásio)
 I'm All Right - Madeleine Peyroux (Music theme of Branca and Macieira)
 The Look of Love (From Casino Royale) - Diana Krall ( Music theme of Célia Mara)
 Yesterday - Liverpool Kids (Music theme of  Gioconda)
 All She Wants (O Xote das Meninas) - Marina Elali ( Music theme of Solange and Claudius)
 You my Love - Double You ( Music theme of Clarissa and Duda)

Instrumental music
The album containing the original score written by Victor Pozas and instrumental versions of the soundtrack:

 Tema de Maria Paula (Music theme of Maria Paula) - Victor Pozas
 E Vamos à Luta  - Gonzaguinha
 Tá Perdoado  - Arlindo Cruz
 Tema de Claudius  (Music theme of Claudius) - Victor Pozas
 Coisas que eu Sei  - Dudu Falcão
 O Trem Parte  - Victor Pozas
 Delírio dos Mortais  - Djavan
 Oração ao Tempo  - Caetano Veloso
 A Obra  - Victor Pozas
 Geraldinos e Arquibaldos  - Gonzaguinha
 A Descoberta  - Victor Pozas
 Tema de Hermógenes, Adalberto e Marconi  (Music theme of Hermógenes, Adalberto and Marconi) - Victor Pozas
 Folhetim  - Chico Buarque
 A Espera  - Victor Pozas
 Vida Alegre  - Victor Pozas
 Pot-Pourri: Sambas da Portelinha (Bônus Track) - Victor Pozas

Brazil audience

See also
 Rede Globo

References

External links
 
 Website 
 synopsis
  (trailer)
  (episodes)

2007 telenovelas
2007 Brazilian television series debuts
2008 Brazilian television series endings
Brazilian LGBT-related television shows
Telenovelas set in Pernambuco
Television shows set in Rio de Janeiro (city)
Brazilian telenovelas
TV Globo telenovelas
Portuguese-language telenovelas